Overcome is the debut studio album by British singer Alexandra Burke, released 19 October 2009 on Syco Music. The release of the album came a year after Burke won the British talent show, The X Factor, with the recording process taking place between 2008 and 2009. Critics praised the album for showcasing Burke's vocal charm and characterisation, comparing her vocal to American singers Anastacia and Whitney Houston and its contemporary finish; using a variety of acclaimed producers including RedOne and Ne-Yo.

Upon its release, Overcome debuted at number one on the UK Albums Chart, selling 132,065 copies in its first week, the fourth largest first week sales for a female singer in 2009. The album became a commercial success in Europe being certified double platinum in the United Kingdom and Ireland. To date the album has sold over one million copies worldwide. All six singles released from Overcome peaked within the top twenty on the UK singles chart, three of which reached number one. As well as receiving positive reviews, Overcome earned a nomination for Best Album at the Urban Music Awards.

Background
In December 2008, Burke won the fifth series of the British reality singing competition, The X Factor, having previously entered in 2005. The singer received 58% of the final public vote. Burke's prize was a £1 million recording contract with Syco Records, a subsidiary of Sony BMG, including a £150,000 advance payment. Burke's debut single, a cover of Leonard Cohen's "Hallelujah" was released as the show's "winner's single". Upon winning the show, Burke remarked: "Thank you so much for making my dream come true. I'm the happiest girl alive."

Burke's album was originally scheduled for a March 2009 release in time for Mother's Day. However, following the success of fellow X Factor contestant, Leona Lewis, the album was pushed back for an Autumn release. On 13 February 2009 it was reported that Burke had signed a £3.5 million, five-album United States record deal with Epic Records. After visiting Burke in the studio, Beyoncé spoke of possibly recording a duet with her.

Recording and production

Producers Pharrell Williams and Akon were reportedly asked to produce for the album according to MTV. Burke's website confirmed that RedOne had produced a selection of songs for Burke to work on, including a song titled "Broken Heels", which was the first song recorded for Overcome. Whilst in the states she also worked with Louis Biancaniello, Sam Watters, Jim Jonsin, Rico Love, Roc Nation and Stargate. New production team "Element" announced on their website that they had produced two songs for Burke, including one track which made the final cut for Overcome, titled "Bury Me (6 Feet Under)". Another song, "Dangerous", was released as the B-side for "Bad Boys".

Aside from working with American producers, Burke also collaborated with British singer-songwriter Taio Cruz and Steve Booker. Booker produced the track "You Broke My Heart", which he co-wrote with Niara Scarlett and Pixie Lott, one of several the British singer submitted for the album. According to Booker the song was originally had a different title and it was Simon Cowell that requested the name change. Burke also recorded tracks with British dance duo The Freemasons.

Writing on her official website, Burke has said of the album:
"I said to my manager I want my music to be fun, to be uplifting and to be bold. I want it to reflect my personality. I want it to be in your face, I want it to be a beast. I want it to be energetic and fun. When I record the ballads I want to cry. And if I go through a roller coaster recording this album then I want the listener to go through a roller coaster when they hear it."

Burke has revealed that she is making changes to the album for a US release. Burke has said will still use the same music videos in the United States. The singer quoted that "I'd love for America to go well next year. I'm working on an American version of Overcome," she told the Daily Star. "I'm writing a few things for it. Ideally I just want to lay down some ideas, present it to the label and then see what happens. I don't think we're going to change it that much for the American market as the videos will definitely stay the same. That's the reason I wanted them ("Bad Boys" and "Broken Heels") shot in LA. It's cheaper and wiser to make one video and make it work for both markets."

RedOne will also be producing songs for the re-release:
When we [RedOne and Alexandra] were in the studio together the other day, he was like, 'OK, do your ad libs for the beginning of the track', so I went, 'OK! I'm going to say your name and then I'm going to say mine. I've done that already and I'm going to do it again'. I don't do it on all our tracks though – 'Dumb' doesn't have it and 'The Silence' doesn't have it – but I think that when it's a fun song, the shout-out suits it. This song we were working on the other day is fun and lively, so it just felt right.""Well, we did manage to finish it the other day and it's an uptempo song.

Theft of production demos
On 11 and 12 July 2009 two previously unheard songs surfaced on the internet believed to be produced by The Stereotypes and The Runaways. The songs were titled "Overcome" and "Perfect". Cowell confirmed that the songs were early demo tracks stolen by hackers. A criminal investigation was launched into the incident in support with the International Federation of the Phonographic Industry. At the end of March 2010 it was reported that Burke's Syco Music had suffered once again from computer hackers who managed to obtain 14 of Burke's previously unheard studio recordings as well as 26 from fellow label-mate Leona Lewis. Following the second incident of leaks Cowell has contacted the FBI to track down those responsible. Included in the leaks was newly recorded version of "All Night Long" featuring American rapper, Pitbull which was tipped to be the singer's third single in March 2010. According to Burke, the songs were leaked by "Two little boys in Germany on work experience", working for Syco.

Promotion
Burke helped to launch UK music channel Viva, performing "Bad Boys", "They Don't Know" and "Hallelujah" live for the broadcast. Burke also played a small set including "Bad Boys" and "Hallelujah" at the BBC Switch Live alongside American group The Black Eyed Peas. Burke started her European Promo Tour in Brussels on 18 January, also visiting Amsterdam, Copenhagen, Stockholm, Berlin, Vienna, Zurich, Milan and Paris, where she promoted "Bad Boys" and her debut album, by visiting many radio stations and performing the single making several TV appearances.

Singles
"Hallelujah", a cover of Leonard Cohen's song, was Burke's debut release as The X Factor winner's single. The song, which reached the UK Singles Chart Christmas number-one, broke numerous records including the "fastest-selling download ever across Europe" after selling 105,000 digital copies after just two days of release, and 576,000 copies in its first sales week. The song remained at number-one for three weeks, and was certified Platinum by the British Phonographic Industry. "Hallelujah" went on to sell over one million copies in the United Kingdom alone, and was 2008's biggest selling single in the United Kingdom, despite having only been on sale for two weeks. The song is notable for fuelling a campaign for singer Jeff Buckley's version of the song to become number-one instead of Burke's version. Buckley's rendition eventually reached the United Kingdom's Christmas number-two, making it the first time the same song had occupied both the first and second spots on the singles chart. Burke's version of the song is the seventh best-selling download of all time in the United Kingdom.

"Bad Boys" is the lead single from Overcome, and the second single overall. Described as "21st century techno future-pop" by Burke's website, it features American rapper Flo Rida. In one of the song's earliest reviews, music website Popjustice called the song "literally amazing." Bill Lamb of About.com has said of the single: "big international success seems a real possibility." "Bad Boys" debuted at number-one on the UK and the Irish Singles chart, becoming Burke's second consecutive chart-topper in both countries, selling over 187,000 copies to become the fastest selling single of 2009 in the United Kingdom, and was replaced the following week by her X Factor mentor Cheryl Cole's "Fight for This Love".

"Broken Heels" is the second single from Overcome, and third single overall. It was released on 18 January 2010 and peaked at #8 on UK Singles Chart thus making it Burke's third top ten single in the United Kingdom. The single peaked #5 on the Irish Singles Chart.

"All Night Long" is the third single from Overcome. It was confirmed by Burke as her fourth single via her Twitter page. The song's video was filmed on Saturday 27 March 2010 in London and has been remixed to include American rapper Pitbull. The song reached #4 on UK Singles Chart. The single has reached #1 on the Irish Singles Chart, making it Burke's third number-one single in Ireland. It also reached number 24 on the Dutch Top 40.

"Start Without You" was the fourth single from Overcome, included on the repackaged edition of the album. It was released on 5 September 2010 and is debuted at #1 on the UK Singles Chart, selling 73,000 copies in its first week. The song became her 3rd number-one single in the United Kingdom. The single debuted at #5 on the Irish Singles Chart, becoming her fifth consecutive top-five hit in Ireland.

"The Silence" was the fifth and final single from Overcome. Burke performed the single on The X Factor a day before the single's release. The single was released digitally on 5 December 2010, the day the deluxe version of Overcome was released. The music video premiered via Burke's official YouTube account on 21 October 2010.

Tour
Burke embarked on the All Night Long Tour on 14 January 2011, in support of Overcome.

Critical reception

The album has received mainly positive reviews. Giving the album four out of five stars, Alex Hardy of The Times stated "last year’s X Factor winner belts out a few impeccably voiced big ballads, but they’re merely fillers among sci-fi disco tracks and bassy, beaty collaborations that often more closely resemble Christina Aguilera or Lady Gaga." Alexis Petridis of The Guardian said that "Broken Heels" is a "spectacularly polished product." His review also praised the album's ballads saying "[t]he ballads are seldom the highlight of any pop-soul album, but at least here they come equipped with booming post-Umbrella beats to distract you from the river of lyrical drivel – you lift me up, been hurt so many times before, some things are worth fighting for, and so on." Petridis gave the album three out of five stars, noting that "'Bury Me' and 'You Broke My Heart' are Motown pastiches that seem a little too craven and obvious in their pursuit of the Duffy market." Another reviewer for The Guardian drew comparisons with Barbadian singer Rihanna, whilst calling the album "cast-iron edifice of a debut" and saying it has a "crack team of producers." Al Fox of the BBC said that the album is "relevant, it’s contemporary, it’s edgy enough for younger fans but accessible enough for a wider audience", calling it "swathed in personality."

Commercial performance
Overcome debuted at number one on the UK Albums Chart, selling 132,065 in its first week according to the British Phonographic Industry. Its first-week numbers were the third largest first-week sales by a female artist in 2009 behind releases by Susan Boyle and Leona Lewis and was the twenty-second best-selling album of 2009, and the forty-third best-selling album of 2010. The album spent 60 weeks on the UK Albums Chart and has been certified double platinum by The British Recorded Music Industry for shipments over 600,000 copies. As of November 2015, the album had sold 821,189 copies in the United Kingdom.

In Ireland, where the album made its first chart appearance, It debuted at number two behind Michael Bublé's fourth album Crazy Love, eventually being certified double-platinum for sales over 30,000. Elsewhere in Europe, Overcome received a moderate reception, debuting inside the top 40 in Greece and Australia and the top 100 in Switzerland, Germany and Poland. To date, the album has sold over one copies worldwide.

Track listing
Information taken from Overcome liner notes.

Deluxe edition

Notes
 denotes co-producer

Chart positions

Weekly charts

Year-end charts

Certifications

Release history

Deluxe edition

References

External links
 
 Overcome
 

2009 debut albums
Alexandra Burke albums
Epic Records albums
Syco Music albums
Albums produced by Brian Kennedy (record producer)
Albums produced by Jim Jonsin
Albums produced by Ne-Yo
Albums produced by RedOne
Albums produced by Rico Love
Albums produced by Stargate
Albums produced by the Smeezingtons